Maymunah bint al-Harith al-Hilaliyyah, was the eleventh and final wife of Muhammad. Her original name was Barrah, which Muhammad changed it to Maymunah, meaning "good tidings", as his marriage to her marked the first time in seven years when he could enter his hometown of Mecca from Medina.

Family
Her father was Al-Harith ibn Hazn from the Hilali tribe of Mecca. Her mother was Hind bint Awf from the Himyari tribe in Yemen. Her full sister was Lubaba the Elder. Her paternal half-sisters were Layla (Lubaba the Younger), Huzayla and Azza. Her maternal half-siblings were Mahmiyah ibn Jaz'i al-Zubaydi, Asma bint Umays (a wife of Abu Bakr), Salma bint Umays (a wife of Hamza ibn Abd al-Muttalib) and Awn ibn Umays. Ibn Kathir also mentions a tradition that Zaynab bint Khuzayma (a wife of Muhammad) was another maternal sister.

Marriage
Maymunah was first married to Abu Ruhm ibn Abd al-Uzza who later passed away. Not much is known about him.
She was in her late 30s when she married him. Maymuna lived with Muhammad for three years until his death in 632.

Death

Maymuna is believed to have died in the month of Dhu al-Hijjah, 51 AH; January 671 CE.
Her death date is debated however. According to Al-Tabari: "Maymuna died in the year 61 AH (680–681 CE) during the caliphate of Yazid I. She was the last of the wives of the Prophet to die, and her age was then 80 or 81." However, Al-Tabari asserts elsewhere that Umm Salama outlived Maymuna.

Ibn Hajar also cites a tradition implying that Maymuna predeceased Aisha: "We stood on the walls of Medina, looking out … [Aisha said]: 'By Allah! Maymuna is no more! She has gone, and you are left free to do whatever you like. She was the most pious of all of us and the most devoted to her relatives.'"

See also
 Adnan
 Adnanite Arabs
 Family tree of Muhammad
 Banu Hashim

References

External links
Al Islam Dictionary
Roots Web

594 births
674 deaths
Women companions of the Prophet
Banu Hilal
Wives of Muhammad
Muslim female saints